Joseph Arthur Edgar Alexandre (March 4, 1907 – April 11, 1976) was a Canadian professional ice hockey player who played 11 games in the National Hockey League with the Montreal Canadiens during the 1931–32 and 1932–33 seasons. The rest of his career, which lasted from 1930 to 1938, was mainly spent in the Canadian–American Hockey League. He played left wing.

Playing career
Alexandre was born in Saint-Jean-sur-Richelieu, Quebec, and played most of his career in minor hockey, mainly in Montreal based teams. He managed to play 11 games for the Canadiens, scoring no goals and 2 assists. He played most of his games in the Canadian–American Hockey League with the Providence Reds, Quebec Castors and the Springfield Indians.

Career statistics

Regular season and playoffs

External links
 

1907 births
1976 deaths
Canadian ice hockey left wingers
French Quebecers
Ice hockey people from Quebec
Kansas City Greyhounds players
Montreal Canadiens players
People from Saint-Jean-sur-Richelieu
Providence Reds players
Quebec Castors players
Springfield Indians players